A fender pier is a structure built or attached to protect another structure from damage, such as by ship collision.

The structure in the river around the swing span is a fender pier.

Types of fenders 
Many different types of fenders (also known as bumpers) can be used to prevent damage to piers and boats.

Thick padded fenders 
Thick padded bumpers add are typically constructed from a high density foam and vinyl/polyester trilaminate however there are alternatives such as PVC or rubber. This type of bumper is utilized for its long life when attached to a pier though they can be expensive.

Post/Piling fenders 
Post/Piling bumpers are attached to piers or docks that have been constructed with logs or cylindrical metal posts as the base of the structure. This type of fender is wrapped around the posts of the pier or dock typically the posts are located on the outside edges and provide a cushion for the main platform while abstaining from damage itself.

Recycled tire fenders 
Recycled tire fenders are seen as the most inexpensive way to provide oneself with pier fenders. The fender is created simply by dangling a tire in a location where ship to pier contact may occur thus providing cushioning/protection for the ship and pier.

Corner fenders 
Listed below are multiple types of corner fenders.

Corner fenders 
This type of corner fender offers "vertical protection" to corners of piers/docks as the fixtures wraps around the corner of the structure offering protection to perhaps the easiest part of the structure to hit.

Lay-flat fenders 
This type of corner fender offers a sleek look that does not protrude or impact the lines of the pier or dock while still offering almost the same protection (does not protect the top face of the corner).

Edge-wrapper 
Similar to the Lay-flat fender this fender wraps around the corner of the pier or dock however this type of fender covers the top face in order to offer full protection at the expense of some aesthetics.

Dock wheel 
This fender is a rolling wheel style where a boat can easily slide by without as much jarring impact as it rolls off the wheel they can be mounted anywhere along the span of the dock or pier and are generally applied to corners.

References

Architectural elements